Persis Maryam Karim (born 1962) is an American poet, essayist, editor, and educator. She serves as the Neda Nobari Distinguished Chair and director of the Center for Iranian Diaspora Studies at San Francisco State University (SFSU) since 2017. Her work focuses on Iranians living outside of Iran, specifically Iranian Americans, and their complicated histories and identities which is often presented through storytelling.

Biography  
Persis Maryam Karim was born in 1962 in Walnut Creek, California. Her father was an Iranian, born in Paris; her mother was French and had immigrated from Dijon, France. She was the youngest child in her family (with six siblings and two step-siblings), and was raised in the San Francisco Bay Area.  

Karim attended the University of California, Santa Cruz (BA 1985), and University of Texas at Austin (PhD 1998, comparative literature). She had studied under poet Al Young. 

Karim is known for editing anthologies and sharing the stories of Iranian-Americans, including A World Between: Poems, Short Stories, and Essays by Iranian-Americans (1999) and Tremors: New Fiction by Iranian American Writers (2013). From 1999 until 2017, Karim worked at San José State University, where she was a co-director of its Persian Studies Program.

Publications

Contributions

See also 
 List of Iranian women writers

References

External links 
 Profile at San Francisco State University
 Profile at San Jose State University

1962 births
Living people
People from Walnut Creek, California
University of California, Santa Cruz alumni
University of Texas at Austin alumni
Poets from California
American editors
American Iranologists
American people of French descent
American writers of Iranian descent
20th-century American poets
21st-century American poets
San Francisco State University faculty
San Jose State University faculty
20th-century American women writers
21st-century American women writers
American women editors
Iranian diaspora studies scholars
Comparative literature academics